Donghuan South Road Station is a subway station on Line 1 of the Ningbo Rail Transit that started operations on 30May 2014 and served as the terminus until extension of the line to Xiapu on 19 March 2016. It is situated under Ningchuan Road in Yinzhou District, Ningbo.

Exits

References

Railway stations in Zhejiang
Railway stations in China opened in 2014
Ningbo Rail Transit stations